The Mike Berticelli Excellence in Coaching Education Award or the Mike Berticelli Award is a national recognition given by United Soccer Coaches to present to an individual in the USC Academy staff who was provided "positive contributions to the game of soccer and excellence in coaching education". The award is named in Mike Berticelli who was the head coach of the Notre Dame Fighting Irish men's soccer program and died in 2000 while serving as the United Soccer Coaches' (then National Soccer Coaches Association of America) Vice President of Education.

The award was first given following the 2000 NCAA men's and women's soccer season to Jim Lennox.

Past Award Winners

See also

 List of sports awards honoring women

References

External links 
 Mike Berticelli Award

Awards established in 2000
Association football trophies and awards
College soccer trophies and awards in the United States
Women's association football trophies and awards